Raorchestes flaviventris is a species of arboreal, nocturnal, frog of the family Rhacophoridae. It is endemic to the Western Ghats, South India. Its common name is yellow-bellied bush frog.

Its natural habitats are tropical moist montane forests. It is endemic to the Anaimalai hills, occurring in the Valparai area and also in Munnar, in Tamil Nadu and Kerala states of South India. This species may also be found in Palni hills but this requires confirmation.

References

Further reading
 Abraham, R. K., A. Zachariah, and V. P. Cyriac. 2015. A reappraisal of the rhacophorid bush frog Raorchestes flaviventris (Boulenger, 1882), with an evaluation of the taxonomic status of R. emeraldi Vijayakumar, Dinesh, Prabhu and Shankar, 2014. Zootaxa 4048: 90–100.
 Bossuyt, F., and A. Dubois. 2001. A review of the frog genus Philautus Gistel, 1848 (Amphibia, Anura, Ranidae, Rhacophorinae). Zeylanica. Colombo 6: 1–112.
 Vijayakumar, S. P., K. P. Dinesh, M. V. Prabhu, and K. Shanker. 2014. Lineage delimitation and description of nine new species of bush frogs (Anura: Raorchestes, Rhacophoridae) from the Western Ghats Escarpment . Zootaxa 3893: 451–488.

External links

flaviventris
Endemic fauna of the Western Ghats
Frogs of India
Amphibians described in 1882
Taxa named by George Albert Boulenger
Taxonomy articles created by Polbot